Mark Warschauer is a professor in the Department of Education and the Department of Informatics at the University of California, Irvine, director of UCI's Ph.D. in Education program and founding director of UCI's Digital Learning Lab.  He is the author or editor of eight books and more than 100 scholarly papers on topics related to technology use for language and literacy development, education, and social inclusion.

Intellectual contribution

Warschauer's contributions fall in four areas:
technology and language learning,
technology and literacy,
the digital divide, and
laptops in education.

Warschauer is among education researchers that recognize the potential of technologies, such as laptops, for fostering increased learning opportunities for second language learners. His several books on the topic, including Internet for English Teaching, Virtual Connections, Telecollaboration in Foreign Language Learning, and Network-Based Language Teaching, attracted the attention of second and foreign language teachers and researchers around the world. In these books, Warschauer critiqued previous views of computer-assisted language learning, which often emphasized tutorials of grammar and vocabulary, and instead articulated a vision of global citizenship and agency through online communication and research.

Warschauer expanded this vision with his book Electronic Literacy: Language, Culture, and Power in Online Education. This book focused on two themes that became prominent in his career: the particular skills and competency involved in becoming literate in the digital age, and the impact of this digital literacy on overcoming the marginalization of culturally and linguistically diverse learners.

Warschauer's book Technology and Social Inclusion: Rethinking the Digital Divide, and his numerous articles on the same topic, including one in Scientific American, critiqued the traditional view of the digital divide as focused narrowly on hardware and software, and instead illustrated how social relations, human capital, culture and language were all critical for shaping people's access to and use of new information and communication technologies. The book was based on Warschauer's research on technology, education, and social development projects in Egypt, Brazil, China, India, and the U.S. In this book, Warschauer explains three models of information and communications technology (ICT) and the digital divide: devices, conduits, and literacy. While approaching ICT access in terms of access to devices and conduits might be the simplest way to understand the digital divide, these models of access neglect the technological aptitude necessary to effectively utilize ICTs. Instead, he argues for the third model of access, literacy, as the superior model.

Warschauer's most recent area of research focuses on laptop computers in education. His book, Laptops and Literacy: Learning in the Wireless Classroom analyzes how students learn to read, write, think, conduct research, and produce media in the laptop classroom. Though mostly a positive account, it includes enough negative examples to illustrate a point central to all of Warschauer's work, that of technology as intellectual and social amplifier. In this case, laptops were demonstrated to help good schools become better, but only exacerbated problems in troubled schools.

Background

Warschauer served as a faculty researcher and doctoral candidate at the University of Hawaii, where he published several of his early books and also organized two seminal international symposia on technology and language learning. While at the University of Hawaii, Warschauer also founded and edited Language Learning & Technology, one of the first peer-reviewed academic journals published on the World Wide Web.

Following Hawaii, Warschauer took a position as director of educational technology on a large language education US aid project in Egypt. Warschauer's work in Egypt, which he wrote about extensively, also served as a basis for his publications on the digital divide.

Since 2001, Warschauer has been a professor in the Department of Education and the Department of Informatics at the University of California, Irvine, where he also contributes to the Center for Research on Information Technology and Organizations and the Ada Byron Research Center for Diversity in Computing and Information Technology. Warschauer is the founding director of the PhD in Education program at UC Irvine, one of the few graduate programs in the U.S. that includes a specialization in Language, Literacy, and Technology.

Recognition
Warschauer was the recipient in 1998 of the Educational Testing Service/TOEFL Policy Council Award for outstanding international contribution in the field of technology and language learning. His books have been translated into Chinese, Japanese, and Portuguese and have been critically acclaimed in fields as diverse as education, media studies, cultural studies, communication, sociology, and information studies. He has been a keynote speaker at conferences in education and applied linguistics throughout the world.

Personal life

Loss of his son 
On August 8, 2003, the body of Mark Warschauer's first son Michael was discovered in the backseat of Warschauer's car in the UC Irvine parking lot. Only 10 months old, "Mikey" had died of heat stroke. Warschauer told police he had intended to take Mikey to a day care center before going to his office, but had simply forgotten the boy was with him. Two months later prosecutors announced that they would not pursue criminal charges against Mark Warschauer, ruling the boy's death accidental. Following the tragic event, Warschauer became active in groups educating parents about children's safety in and around cars. He and his wife went on to have three subsequent children.

Sample publications

Authored and co-authored books
 Warschauer, M. (2006). Laptops and literacy. New York: Teachers College Press.
 Warschauer, M. (2003). Technology and social inclusion: Rethinking the digital divide. Cambridge, MA: MIT Press.
 Warschauer, M. (1999). Electronic literacies: Language, culture, and power in online education. Mahwah, New Jersey: Lawrence Erlbaum Associates.
 Warschauer, M. (1995). E-mail for English teaching: Bringing the Internet and computer learning networks into the language classroom. Alexandria, Virginia: TESOL Publications.
 Warschauer, M, Shetzer, H. & Meloni, C. (2000). Internet for English Teaching. Alexandria, VA: TESOL Publications.

Edited and co-edited books
 Thomas, M., Reinders, H., & Warschauer, M.(Eds.). (2012). Contemporary computer-assisted language learning. London & New York: Bloomsbury Contemporary Linguistics Series.
 Warschauer, M., & Kern, R. (Eds.). (2000). Network-based language teaching: Concepts and practice. Cambridge: Cambridge University Press Applied Linguistics Series.
 Warschauer, M. (Ed.) (1996) Telecollaboration in foreign language learning. Honolulu, HI: University of Hawai'i Second Language Teaching and Curriculum Center.
 Warschauer, M. (Ed.) (1995).Virtual connections: Online activities and projects for networking language learners. Honolulu, HI: University of Hawai'i Second Language Teaching and Curriculum Center

References

External links
 Professor page at University of California, Irvine
 UC Irvine PhD in Education program
 Warschauer’s published books
 Warschauer’s published papers
 Language Learning & Technology journal

University of California, Irvine faculty
Living people
Year of birth missing (living people)
University of Hawaiʻi alumni